Marco Miranda (born 2 June 1998) is a Swiss professional ice hockey left winger who is currently playing with Genève-Servette HC of the National League (NL). He previously played for the GCK Lions and the ZSC Lions.

Playing career
Miranda made his professional debut with the GCK Lions of the Swiss League (SL) in the 2015-16 season, appearing in 36 SL games this season. He made his National League (NL) debut in the 2017-18 season with the ZSC Lions, playing 12 games and scoring one goal. Miranda also played the 2015 playoffs with Zurich's junior team in the Elite Junior A, scoring 7 points in 8 games and helped the team win the championship.

Miranda eventually played 62 NL games (11 points) with Zurich and 102 SL games (50 points) with their affiliate before signing a three-year contract with an option for a fourth season with Genève-Servette HC on December 3, 2018. The contract runs from the 2019/20 season through the 2021/22 season.

In December 2019, Miranda was loaned to HC Ambrì-Piotta for the 2019 Spengler Cup. He recorded 1 assist in 3 games as Ambri-Piotta fell to Ocelari Trinec in the semi finals.

Miranda left the first game of the 2020-21 season early in the third period after a knee-on-knee collision with HC Davos' Sven Jung. He underwent medical exams the next day and was forced to sit out the first two months of the season.

On February 17, 2022, Miranda agreed to a two-year contract extension with Servette to remain at the club through the 2023/24 season.

International play
Miranda made his debut with Switzerland men's team in 2018.

References

External links

1998 births
Living people
GCK Lions players
Genève-Servette HC players
Swiss ice hockey left wingers
ZSC Lions players
Ice hockey people from Zürich